"Last Time Around" was one of the songs of which a preview was leaked online before the album release on February 2, 2010.

Background and composition

According to M Magazine Selena Gomez was the inspiration for the song. 

According to Popstar magazine the song is about Selena Gomez or Miley Cyrus.
Nick told Popstar magazine:

On May 11, 2010, the song was used on the live album: Nick Jonas & The Administration Live at the Wiltern January 28th, 2010.

Versions
 "Last Time Around" (Album Version) - 4:07 
 "Last Time Around" (Live) - 7:16 
 "Last Time Around" (Video Version) - 4:27

Music video

On the Limited Edition DVD there was a video of Nick Jonas & The Administration (shot in black & white) performing the song.

Live performances
Nick Jonas performed the song live for the first time on January 2 during the Who I Am Tour with the Administration.
Nick performed with Sonny Thompson acoustic versions of the songs "Last Time Around", "Who I Am", "Tonight" during Radio Disney Total Access; 
  
On September 18, 2010, Nick performed two songs: "Who I Am" and "Last Time Around" during a concert in Mountain View, CA as part of the Jonas Brothers Live In Concert.

On February 23, 2011, Nick performed the song during an acoustic set, accompanied by Jonas Brothers guitarist John Taylor.
He performed an acoustic version the song on August 6, during the promotion of the Quaker Chewy Live Launch 

Along With Sonny Thompson Nick performed at the Military Event in Columbus, Ohio on April 14, 2011. He played the songs Last Time Around and Who I Am.

They opened their performance with the song on July 16, during the Ottawa Blues fest.
On August 13, 2011, he performed the song at Musikfest.
The song was also performed during the concerts in South America as part of the Nick Jonas 2011 Tour.

On December 13, 2011, a video of Nick performing Last Time Around was posted online as part of a new internet serie Fandrop. The video shows some lucky fans seeing Nick Jonas & the administration rehearse for the Nick jonas 2011 Tour.

On May 20, 2012, Nick performed an acoustic version of the song in between two shows of How to Succeed in Business Without Really Trying.

The song was performed during all of the Jonas Brothers World Tour 2012/2013. It was also performed during the 2013 National School Choice Week's official Kickoff Celebration  in Phoenix, Arizona.
They performed the song again on June 1 during the Acapulco Festival in Mexico.
The song "Last Time Around" was performed again during  the Jonas Brothers Live Tour.

Personnel
Nick Jonas - Lead Vocals, Lead Guitar, Composer
Tommy Barbarella - Keyboards
Michael Bland - Drums, Vibraphone, Vocals
Sonny Thompson -Guitars, Vocals (on DVD Who I Am, and live performances)
John Fields - Bass, Guitars, Percussion, Vibraphone, Producer
David Ryan Harris - Guitars, Vocals (on CD Who I Am)
Greg Garbowsky - Composer
P.J Bianco - Composer
Dave McNair - Mastering
Jon Lind - A&R
David Snow - Creative Director
Paul David Hager - Mixing
Philip McIntyre - Management
Johnny Wright - Management
Kevin Jonas SR. - Management

Release History

References

2010 songs
Nick Jonas & the Administration songs
Songs written by Nick Jonas
Songs written by Greg Garbowsky
Song recordings produced by John Fields (record producer)
Songs written by PJ Bianco